The  mixed individual BC2 boccia event at the 2020 Summer Paralympics is taking place between 28 August to 4 September at Ariake Gymnastics Centre in Tokyo. 24 competitors took part.

Final stage
The knockout stage will be played between 30 August to 1 September.

Pool stages

Pool A

Pool B

Pool C

Pool D

Pool E

Pool F

References

Individual BC2